Tour To-Lyon is a mixed-use skyscraper under construction in the La Part-Dieu business district of Lyon, France. The building will include 66,000m2 of office space, 10,500m2 of hotel space and 3,500 m2 of retail space.
With a height of 170m it will become the second-tallest skyscraper in Lyon after Tour Incity (202m) completed in 2015.

On 5 September 2019 Apicil Group that will occupy 20,000m2 of the tower announced a deal with the developer of the project Vinci Immobilier to acquire the totality of the office space (66,000m2) for an estimated price of €500 million.

On 9 September 2019 Vinci Immobilier with the presence of Gerard Collomb the Mayor of Lyon, Dominique Perrault the architect and Philippe Barret CEO of Apicil Group have officially launched the tower project with a symbolic laying of the building's foundation stone.

References 

Skyscrapers in Lyon
Buildings and structures completed in 2022
21st-century architecture in France